Portrait of the Goddess is the second studio album by American metalcore band Bleeding Through. The album was released on April 30, 2002 through Indecision Records.

Tracks "Just Another Pretty Face", "Turns Cold to the Touch", "III Part 2" and "I Dream of July" first appeared on their debut album Dust to Ashes and the band decided to re-record the tracks for this album.

Track listing

Personnel
Scott Danough – guitar
Brian Leppke – guitar   
Brandan Schieppati – vocals
Mick Morris - Bass
Molly Street – keyboard
Derek Youngsma – drums
Greg Koller – producer, engineer, mastering  
Dave Mandel – layout design  
Mike Milford – layout design

References

Bleeding Through albums
Indecision Records albums
2002 albums